Psoroptidae is a family of parasitic mites, which are  long and live on the surface of the skin, rather than burrowing into it. These mites affect various species, including cats, dogs, rabbits, cattle, sheep, and horses, causing skin inflammation, scabs, crusting, and hair loss.

The following genera are within the family Psoroptidae:
 Psoroptes
 Chorioptes
 Otodectes

See also 
 List of mites associated with cutaneous reactions

References

Sarcoptiformes
Acari families